Prairie Raiders is a 1947 American Western film directed by Derwin Abrahams and written by Ed Earl Repp. The film stars Charles Starrett, Nancy Saunders, Mark Roberts, Ozie Waters and Smiley Burnette. The film was released on May 29, 1947, by Columbia Pictures.

Plot

Cast          
Charles Starrett as Steve Bolton / The Durango Kid
Nancy Saunders as Ann Bradford
Mark Roberts as Bronc Masters 
Ozie Waters as Ozie Waters	
Smiley Burnette as Smiley Burnette
Hugh Prosser as Spud Henley
Lane Bradford as Stark
Ray Bennett as Flagg
Douglas D. Coppin as Clerk Briggs
Steve Clark as Sheriff
Tommy Coats as Shorty
Frank LaRue as Bradford
John Cason as Cinco
Sam Flint as Secretary of the Interior

References

External links
 

1947 films
American Western (genre) films
1947 Western (genre) films
Columbia Pictures films
Films directed by Derwin Abrahams
American black-and-white films
1940s English-language films
1940s American films